Kadiyangad is a village in Kozhikode district, Kerala.

Location
Kadiyangad is a small Village/hamlet in Koyilandy Taluk in Kozhikode District of Kerala, India. It comes under Changaroth Panchayath. It belongs to North Kerala Division . It is located 42 km towards North from District headquarters Kozhikode. 5 km from Perambra. 432 km from State capital Thiruvananthapuram.
Kadiyangad Pin code is 673525 and postal head office is Perampra.

Transportation
Kadiyangad village connects to other parts of India through Vatakara city on the west and Kuttiady town on the east.  National highway No.66 passes through Vatakara and the northern stretch connects to Mangalore, Goa and Mumbai.  The southern stretch connects to Cochin and Trivandrum.  The eastern Highway  going through Kuttiady connects to Mananthavady, Mysore and Bangalore. The nearest airports are at Kannur and Kozhikode.  The nearest railway station is at Vatakara.

References

Villages in Kozhikode district
Vatakara area